"All I Need" is a song by the American musician Dan Hartman, released in 1981 as the third and final single from his fourth studio album It Hurts to Be in Love. It was written and produced by Hartman.

Released in America only, "All I Need" reached No. 10 on the Billboard Bubbling Under the Hot 100 Chart, making its debut on September 26, 1981. The song also reached No. 41 on the Billboard Hot Adult Contemporary Tracks Chart. The song, like the entire It Hurts to Be in Love album, was recorded at the Schoolhouse, mixed at Power Station and mastered at Sterling Sound. The Schoolhouse was Hartman's own home studio in Connecticut.

Release
"All I Need" was released by Blue Sky on 7" vinyl in America only. It was distributed and manufactured by CBS Records. The B-side, "Forever in a Moment", was taken from the It Hurts to Be in Love album. A promotional edition of the single was also issued, featuring "All I Need" on both sides of the vinyl.

"All I Need" was also the B-side to the Dutch version of the "It Hurts to Be in Love" single. Later in 1981, April Music issued a compilation of Hartman's music, simply titled Dan Hartman. It featured four tracks from It Hurts to Be in Love, including "All I Need".

Critical reception
Upon release, Cash Box commented: "A spacious production surrounds this dreamy adult pop, A/C cut, as the heavily echoed vocals and instrumentals move from a simple piano opening to big, string-filled crescendoes."

Track listing
7" single
"All I Need" - 4:07
"Forever in a Moment" - 3:12

7" single (promo)
"All I Need" - 4:07
"All I Need" - 4:07

Chart performance

Personnel
 Dan Hartman - vocals, keyboards, producer, recording
 Erik Cartwright – guitar
 John Pierce - bass
 Art Wood - drums
 Jeff Bova - synthesizer
 Neil Dorfsman - mixing
 Barry Bongiovi, Dave Greenberg, James Farber, Ray Willhard - assistant engineers, mixing
 Jeff Jones - recording
 Steve Paul, Teddy Slatus - management, coordinators

References

1981 singles
Dan Hartman songs
Song recordings produced by Dan Hartman
Songs written by Dan Hartman
1981 songs
Blue Sky Records singles